The 1910 Arkansas gubernatorial election was held on September 12, 1910.

Incumbent Democratic Governor George Washington Donaghey defeated Republican nominee Andrew I. Roland and Socialist nominee Dan Hogan with 67.44% of the vote.

General election

Candidates
George Washington Donaghey, Democratic, incumbent Governor
Andrew I. Roland, Republican, judge
Dan Hogan, Socialist, publisher, candidate for Governor in 1906

Results

References

1910
Arkansas
Gubernatorial